Bob Green (born 1950) is a former American football coach who is most known for his 24-year tenure as the head coach of the Montana Tech Orediggers football team. As of 2023, he is the longest tenured and winningest coach in Montana Tech history.<ref name="hof"

Early life
Bob Green graduated from Lincoln Southeast High School in Lincoln, Nebraska in 1968. Following his graduation, Green enlisted in the United States Marine Corps and served approximately two years in the Vietnam War. He received basic decorations for his service, including the National Defense Service Medal, Vietnam Service Medal, and Combat Action Ribbon, among others.<ref name="honor"

Upon his release from the Marine Corps, Green attended the University of Nebraska at Kearney from 1970 to 1974, where he played as a defensive back for four years. After his graduation, Green stayed at the school as a student assistant coach for a year, which began his coaching career.<ref name="honor"

Pre-Montana Tech
After coaching for a year as a student assistant at his alma mater, Green became the head coach and athletic director at Minatare High School in Minatare, Nebraska from 1975 to 1979. In 1980, Green took an assistant coach job at Northern Colorado, and returned to high school coaching in 1981, where he became the head coach for Broken Bow High School in Broken Bow, Nebraska for a year. In 1982, Green took another college assistant coaching job and joined the staff of Northwest Missouri State until his departure following the 1986 season.<ref name="journey"

Montana Tech and legacy
Bob Green accepted the head coaching job at Montana Tech in 1987. At the time of his arrival, the Montana Tech football program hadn't made a post-season appearance since 1971. However, by 1992, the Orediggers had a 7–4 record and a playoff berth, and in 1996, Montana Tech became the first Frontier Conference school to ever make the NAIA National Championship game.<ref name="frontier"

Under Bob Green, Montana Tech had its most successful period in football. During Green's 24-year tenure, the Orediggers compiled a record of 140 wins, 116 losses, and 1 tie. Green led Montana Tech to the NAIA National Playoffs five times (1992, 1996, 1997, 2004, and 2005), including the 1996 National Championship Game.<ref name="stats" Bob Green retired from coaching following the 2010 season. Green remained active with the school after his retirement, working in various publicity and development positions.

In 2013, Montana Tech's football stadium, Alumni Coliseum, replaced its grass field with a new artificial turf surface. The school named the new field after Green in honor of his accomplishments. Green was inducted into the school's athletic hall of fame the same year.<ref name="hof"

In Popular Culture
Video compilations of Green's interviews have gone viral over the years due to his sense of humor and unusual sayings.

Quotes from Bob Green include:
"We were like the kid that plays second french horn in the school band, we gotta play better."
"It's a double edged sword. It's like watching your mother-in-law go off a cliff in a Cadillac. You have mixed feelings."
"He's like a black lab on the first day of pheasant hunting season, he was pulling at the chain."
"We gotta be like a woodpecker in a petrified forest, just keep busy and look for opportunities."
"I wanted to raise my kids using a depth chart! Can you imagine that?"
"I've got a real short memory, just like when I was in third grade. Two of the best years of my life!"
"I don't like that bottled water, I like that Butte water. You get to eat and drink at the same time."
"Some aspects look like we're really ready to play. A couple other aspects look like we just got off Willie Nelson's tour bus."
"His attitude is positive, he thinks he can take on hell with a squirt gun."
"My wife couldn't go to church with me on Sunday. Everybody said, "where is she?" I said she doesn't go out with losers."
"You could've used that to torture prisoners into making confessions. That was a bad football game."
"I used to coach high school track. I wasn't a very good coach, I told them to turn left and come back soon."
"Don't pour a bucket of water over my head and tell me it's raining. Know the rules!"

References

Further reading
 Bob Green Montana Tech Hall of Fame Bio
 A Coach Who Never Threw His Players Under The Bus

1950 births
Living people
Sportspeople from Butte, Montana
Montana Tech Orediggers football coaches
Sportspeople from Lincoln, Nebraska
United States Marine Corps personnel of the Vietnam War